Saint Philip is a parish of Barbados at the easternmost end of the island. Saint Philip’s Parish Church was built as the Anglican parish church in 1640.

St. Philip has the largest land area of the 11 parishes of Barbados and has a relatively flat 'close to sea-level' terrain. St. Philip has the largest area of crop cultivation making it locally considered "the country". St. Philip does not have a 'true' city as some other parishes but rather 'areas' and 'villages'. Six Cross Roads is the largest area by virtue of both commercial and residential population and is the central hub for the parish.

Six Cross Roads, or locally known as just Six Roads, is a roundabout and its immediate neighborhood of which six roads converge extended in from the west 'from city' (Bridgetown); north-west toward Four Cross Roads and St. George; north-east toward Bushy Park; east toward Bayfield; south-east toward The Crane; south-west toward Oistins. Though there are a few areas in Barbados known as 'Four Cross Roads' there is only one area known as 'Six Cross Roads'. This parish is home to the only 'dependency' of Barbados called Culpepper Island. This tiny rock in the ocean is used as a feeding ground for sheep but cannot be reached unless by boat or by foot at low tide.
The parish of Saint Philip is the main on-shore area of Barbados involved in the local oil industry.

St. Philip is well-known on the local music and entertainment scene for producing entertainers. Well-known calypsonians and performers Red Plastic Bag, John King, Ronnie D. and Lil Rick all hail from this eastern parish. It was also the first parish to have its own carnival - The St. Philip Carnival. A 2020 song by calypsonian Ronnie D called the 'St Philip Anthem' honours the parish.

Geography

Populated places
The parish contains the following towns, villages, localities, settlements, communities and hamlets:

Places of interest
 Bayleys Plantation
 Bottom Bay
 Bushy Park Circuit
 Crane Beach
 Foursquare Rum Distillery
 King George V Memorial Park
 Ragged Point Lighthouse
 Sam Lord's Castle and Beach
 St. Philip Parish Church
 Skeete's Bay
 Sunbury Plantation
 Three Houses Park
 Saint Martins Church

Parishes bordering Saint Philip
Saint George - North-West
Saint John - North
Christ Church - West

References

External links
 
 

 
Parishes of Barbados